The list of painters and architects of Venice includes notable painters and architects who have a significant connection to the Italian city of Venice. It is not yet a complete list and additional contributions are welcome.

A 
 Antonio Abbondi (d. 1549), architect
 Jacopo Amigoni (1682–1752), painter, started career in Venice
 Giuseppe Angeli (1712–1798), painter
 Giovanni da Asola (16th century)

B 

 Niccolò Bambini (1651–1736), painter
 Marco Basaiti (c. 1470–1530), painter, rival to Giovanni Bellini
 Pietro Baseggio (14th century), architect and sculptor
 Francesco Bassano the Younger (1549–1592), painter, eldest son of Jacopo Bassano
 Jacopo Bassano (1510–1592), painter
 Leandro da Ponte Bassano (1557–1622), painter, third son of Jacopo Bassano
 Lazzaro Bastiani (1449–1512), painter, teacher of Vittore Carpaccio
 Gentile Bellini (c. 1429–1507), official portrait artist for the Doges of Venice
 Giovanni Bellini (c. 1430–1516), painter, probably the best known of the Bellini family
 Jacopo Bellini (c. 1400–c. 1470), painter, father of Gentile and Giovanni Bellini
 Bernardo Bellotto (c. 1721/1722–1780), urban landscape painter and printmaker
 Giuseppe Benoni (1618–1684), architect
 Eugene de Blaas (1843–1932), painter in the Academic Classicism school
 Boccaccio Boccaccino (c. 1467–c. 1525), painter belonging to the Emilian school
 Camillo Boito (1836–1914), architect and engineer
 Bartolomeo Bon (d. after 1464), architect and sculptor
 Giovanni Bon (1355–1443), architect, father of Bartolomeo Bon
 Paris Bordone (1500–1571), painter who trained with Titian
 Giuseppe Borsato (1771–1849), painter
 Mattia Bortoloni (1696–1750), painter
 Ferruccio Bortoluzzi (1920–2007), painter

C 

 Ippolito Caffi (1814–1866), painter of architecture and seascapes
 Filippo Calendario (d. 1355), architect of the Doges Palace; executed for treason
 Canaletto (1697–1768), painter and printmaker
 Giovanni Candi (died 1506), architect, designer of the Bovolo House (1499)
 Domenico Caprioli (1494–1528), painter
 Luca Carlevaris (1663–1730), painter and engraver
 Vittore Carpaccio (c. 1465–1525/6), painter who studied under Gentile Bellini
 Giulio Carpioni (1613–1678), painter and etcher
 Rosalba Carriera (1675–1757), painter, known for her miniatures and pastels
 Andrea del Castagno (c. 1421–1457), painter who worked briefly in Venice 1442/3
 Bernardino Castelli (1750–1810), painter who did the portrait of Ludovico Manin, the last Doge
 Vincenzo Catena (c. 1470–1531), painter
 Costantino Cedini (1741–1811), fresco painter 
 Andrea Celesti (1637–1712), painter of the Baroque period, working in Venice
 Vincenzo Chilone (1758–1839), painter of vedute
 Guglielmo Ciardi (1842–1917), painter
 Mauro Codussi (1440–1504), architect
 Andrea Cominelli, designer of the main facade of Palazzo Labia
 Cima da Conegliano (c. 1459–c. 1517), painter
 Antonio Contin (1566–1600), designed and built the Bridge of Sighs (1600) 
 Leonardo Corona (1561–1605), painter, probably a pupil of Titian
 Carlo Crivelli (c. 1435–c. 1495), painter, born in Venice

D 

 Vincenzo dalle Destre (before  1488–before 1543), painter 
 Gaspare Diziani (1689–1757), painter, of paintings and theatre scenery
 Apollonio Domenichini (1715–c.1770), painter of vedute

F 
 Giacomo Favretto (1849–1887), painter
 Domenico Fetti (c. 1589–1623), painter
 Francesco Fontebasso (1707–1769), painter, apprenticed to Sebastiano Ricci
 Girolamo Forabosco (1605–1679), painter
 Gian Antonio Fumiani (1645–1710), painter

G 

 Antonio Gambello (mid-1400s), architect and sculptor
 Antonio Gaspari (late 17th century), architect, student of Baldassare Longhena
 Giuseppe Vittore Ghislandi or Fra' Galgario (1655–1743), painter, trained in Venice
 Michele Giambono (c. 1400–c. 1462), painter and mosaic maker
 Giorgione (c. 1477/8–1510), painter, with Titian founded the Venetian school of Renaissance Painting
 Giovanni d'Alemagna (c. 1411–1450), German painter who worked in Venice
 Guglielmo dei Grigi (c. 1485–1550), architect and sculptor, designed the Palazzo dei Camerlenghi
 Jacopo Guarana (1720–1808), painter, president of the Academy of Venetian painting
 Francesco Guardi (1712–1793), painter
 Gianantonio Guardi (1699–1760), painter, one of the founders of the Venetian Academy
 Guariento (mid-1300s), Paduan painter, worked on the great council-hall of Venice

H 
 Francesco Hayez (1791–1881), painter, born and studied in Venice

J 

 Jacobello del Fiore (c. 1370–1439), painter, teacher of Carlo Crivelli

L 
 Cesare Laurenti (1854–1936), painter, lived in Venice from 1881
 Gregorio Lazzarini (1657–1730), painter, born in Venice 
 Pietro Liberi (1605–1687), painter, active in Venice after 1643
 Bernardino Licinio (c. 1489–1565), painter of Venice and Lombardy
 Pietro Lombardo (1435–1515), architect and sculptor, active in Venice
 Baldassare Longhena (1598–1682), architect, born and worked in Venice
 Pietro Longhi (1701/2–1785), painter, born in Venice 
 Lorenzo Lotto (c.1480–1556/7), painter of the Venetian school
 Lorenzo Veneziano (fl.1356–1372), painter
 Jan Lys (1590 or 1597–1629/1630), German painter active mainly in Venice

M 

 Francesco Maffei (1605–1660), painter
 Pietro Malombra (1556–1618), painter
 Giovanni Mansueti (1465–1527), painter
 Andrea Mantegna (1431–1506), painter, engraver and student of archaeology
 Michele Marieschi (1710–1744), painter of landscapes and vedute
 Jacobello dalle Masegne (Venezia, 1350–c. 1409)
 Pierpaolo dalle Masegne (active c. 1380–c. 1410), architect
 Giorgio Massari (1687–1766), architect
 Sebastiano Mazzoni (1611–1678), painter
 Andrea Meldolla (c.1510/15–1563), painter and etcher
 Arrigo Meyring (1628–1723), German sculptor, active in Venice
 Michelino da Besozzo (c. 1370–c. 1455), painter and manuscript illuminator
 Andrea Michieli (c. 1542–1617), painter
 Bartolomeo Montagna (1450–1523), painter and architect
 Francesco Montemezzano (ca. 1540–after 1602), painter of the late-Renaissance or Mannerist period.
 Alessandro Moretto (c. 1498–1554), painter; more commonly known as "Moretto da Brescia"
 Johann Maria Morlaiter (1699–1781), sculptor
 Andrea da Murano (active 1463–1502), painter

P 
 Andrea Palladio (1508–1580), one of the world's major architects
 Palma the Elder (c. 1480–1528), painter
 Palma the Younger (1548/50–1628), painter, follower of Tintoretto
 Veneziano Paolo (before 1333–after 1358), painter
 Giovanni Antonio Pellegrini (1675–1741), decorative painter, best known for his work in England
 Pier Maria Pennacchi (1464–before 1515), painter
 Santo Peranda (1566–1638), painter
 Giovanni Battista Piazzetta (1682–1754), painter, first Director of the Accademia di Belle Arti di Venezia
 Bonifacio Pitati (1487–1553), painter, also known as "Bonifazio Veronese"
 Giambattista Pittoni (1687–1767), painter
 Antonio da Ponte (1512–1595), Swiss-born architect and engineer, best known for rebuilding the Rialto Bridge
 Il Pordenone (c. 1484–1539), painter, real name "Giovanni Antonio de' Sacchis"  
 Giuseppe Porta (1520–1575), painter

R 
 Nicolas Régnier (1591–1667), Flemish painter who worked and died in Venice
 Pietro Ricchi (1606–1675), painter
 Marco Ricci (1676–1730), painter who worked in England with Pellegrini
 Sebastiano Ricci (1659–1734), painter who also worked in London, Paris, Florence and Turin
 Niccolò Roccatagliata (1593–1636), sculptor
 Girolamo Romani (c. 1485–c. 1566), painter
 Johann Rottenhammer (1564–1625), German painter who worked in Venice from 1595–1606; known for his cabinet paintings

S 
 Michele Sanmicheli (1484–1559), architect and urban planner
 Jacopo Sansovino (1486–1570), sculptor and chief architect for the Procurators of San Marco
 Girolamo da Santacroce (c.1480/85–c.1556), painter
 Carlo Saraceni (1579–1620), painter, spent most of his working life in Rome
 Girolamo Savoldo (c.1480/85–after 1548), painter
 Giovanni Scalfurotto (c. 1700–1764), architect
 Vincenzo Scamozzi (1548–1616), architect; author of The Idea of a Universal Architecture
 Sebastiano del Piombo (c. 1485–1547), real name "Sebastiano Luciani", painter who became an assistant to Pope Clement VII (keeper of the leaden seal, hence "Piombo", which means "lead")
 Gian Antonio Selva (1751–1819), architect
 Bernardo Strozzi (c. 1581–1644), painter
 Lambert Sustris (c. 1515–1520–c. 1584), painter of Dutch origin active mainly in Venice

T 
 Tommaso Temanza (1705–1789), architect and writer of biographies
 Giambattista Tiepolo (1696–1770), painter and printmaker who also worked in Germany and Spain
 Giandomenico Tiepolo (1727–1804), painter and printmaker; son of the above
 Domenico Tintoretto (1560–1635), painter, son of Jacopo Tintoretto
 Jacopo Tintoretto (1518–1594), one of the world's major painters
 Andrea Tirali (1657–1737), architect
 Titian (c.1488/90–1576), real name "Tiziano Vecelli"; one of the world's major painters

V 
 Alessandro Varotari (1588–1649), commonly known as "Padovanino", painter
 Antonio Vassilacchi (1556–1629), painter of Greek parentage, known for his decorations in the Doge's Palace
 Pietro della Vecchia (1603–1678), real name "Pietro Muttoni", painter
 Paolo Veronese (1528–1588), one of the world's major painters, known for scenes from history and mythology
 Andrea del Verrocchio (c. 1435–1488), real name "Andrea di Michele di Francesco de' Cioni", painter, sculptor and goldsmith
 Antonio Visentini (1688–1782), architectural designer, painter and engraver
 Alessandro Vittoria (1525–1608), sculptor
 Alvise Vivarini (c.1442/53–c.1503/05), painter
 Antonio Vivarini (fl.1440–1480), painter, father of the Alvise Vivarini
 Bartolomeo Vivarini (c. 1432–c. 1499), painter, brother of Antonio Vivarini

Z 
 Giuseppe Zais (1709–1784), painter
 Antonio Zanchi (1631–1722), painter
 Francesco Zuccarelli (1702–1788), painter; native to Bologna, he served as President of the Accademia di Belle Arti di Venezia and later lived in Florence
 Federico Zuccari (c.1540/41–1609), painter; spent much of his working life in Rome and abroad

References 

Painters and architects
Venice
Venice
 
 
Painters and architects

ja:ヴェネツィア派